Telemaco nell'isola di Calipso is dramma per musica opera by Mayr to a libretto by Antonio Simone Sograffi, composed for the Venice Carnival, 1797. The cast featured the castrato Girolamo Crescentini.

Recordings
 Telemaco, conducted by Franz Hauk, Naxo 2017

References

Operas
1797 operas
Operas by Simon Mayr
Operas based on the Odyssey